was a district located in Shiga Prefecture, Japan.

On October 1, 2004, the former town of Yasu absorbed the town of Chūzu, effectively turning Yasu District into Yasu City. Therefore, Yasu District was dissolved as a result of this merger.

As of 2003, the district had an estimated population of 49,155 and a density of 799.92 persons per km2. The total area was 61.45 km2.

Former Towns and villages
 Chūzu
 Yasu

Transition
Light blue autonomies are Yasu District's town, deep blue autonomies are Yasu District's village, and gray autonomies are others.

Former districts of Shiga Prefecture